Harry Ernest Combs (14 January 1881 – 12 June 1954) was a New Zealand politician of the Labour Party.

Biography

Early life and career
Combs was born in Napier in 1881. He received a state school education in Gisborne. He began work as a runner for The Poverty Bay Herald. He then became a messenger at the post office and became involved with the Post and Telegraph Employees' Association. In 1908 he married Ethel Bessie Webster.

He was the Post and Telegraph Employees' Association's president between 1909 and 1911 and then general secretary from 1916 to 1926. Additionally he was the editor of the association's journal Katipo for twenty years between 1906 and 1926. He played a leading part in the demands for a reclassification of the service in 1918 and in 1920 he led a deputation to Prime Minister William Massey on the question of cost-of-living pay increases.

He was also Secretary of the New Zealand Rugby Union from 1919 to 1926 before establishing his own printing business (in partnership). He was head of the Civic Press Company Limited printing firm.

Political career

At the 1944 local elections he was nominated to be Labour's candidate for the mayoralty, one of five candidates he declined to stand for selection with Labour Party president James Roberts prevailing.

Combs was Parliamentary Under-Secretary to the Minister of Finance from 1947 to 1949.

In 1953, Combs was awarded the Queen Elizabeth II Coronation Medal. In February 1954 he announced he would retire at the general election later that year owing to ill health.

Death
Combs died on 12 June 1954 in Wellington. His death necessitated a by-election, but as a general election was due in November 1954 the nominated Labour candidate Henry May was not opposed, so was declared returned unopposed.

Notes

References

New Zealand Labour Party MPs
1881 births
1954 deaths
Members of the New Zealand House of Representatives
New Zealand MPs for Wellington electorates
Unsuccessful candidates in the 1925 New Zealand general election
Unsuccessful candidates in the 1922 New Zealand general election
New Zealand trade unionists